Cheirophyllum is an extinct plant genus that existed during the Permian.

Location 
In Brazil, fossils of the species  C. speculare were located in the outcrop Morro Papalé in the city of Mariana Pimentel. Fossils of the genus have been found in the geopark Paleorrota in the Itararé Subgroup, and date to the Sakmarian age of the Permian period.

References 

Ginkgophyta
Prehistoric gymnosperm genera
Permian plants
Permian first appearances
Permian extinctions
Prehistoric plants of South America
Permian life of South America
Permian Brazil
Fossils of Brazil
Paraná Basin
Flora of Rio Grande do Sul
Fossil taxa described in 1967